"Rapid construction is a systematic approach to deliver of one kind project with complexity in construction due to limited time schedule, contract agreement, approved construction method and meets client satisfaction.” (Yahya, 2009).

Rapid construction can be achieved through the basic principle of focusing on eliminating waste. The criteria of stabilizing the work flow can be achieved by injecting lean manufacturing principles into the construction process flow. Lean construction is a new way to manage construction. The objective, principles and techniques of lean construction taken together form the basis for a rapid project delivery process. Unlike current approaches to managing construction (including design-build) and programmatic improvement efforts (partnering), lean construction provides the foundation for an operations based rapid construction project delivery system. While the transformation-flow-value theory broadens the understanding of project management, the perception of construction as a complex phenomenon opens up for the introduction of completely new approaches to project management. The ordered approach which gave rise to what can be called management-as-planning and management-as organizing should be reinterpreted and supplemented in future project management. Management as co-operation and as learning comes into focus. The consultant and contractor's familiarity with the system led to significant reductions in construction time and improvements in overall economy. The use of material and workflow in this technology is to provide rapid construction, decrease environmental impacts, increase durability, and reduce on-site labour, resulting in better work zone safety.

Construction